Otohime (乙姫) is the princess of the Dragon Palace in the Japanese folktale Urashima Tarō.

Otohime may also refer to:

 Otohime (音姫, lit. "Sound Princess"), a Japanese brand name for a flushing toilet sound simulator
 Otohime Ryugu, a character in Okami-san and Her Seven Companions
 Mutsumi Otohime, a character from the manga series Love Hina by Ken Akamatsu
 Otohime, a goddess the anime series Lilpri
 Otohime, a character in the 2009 anime series Muromi-san
 , the second daughter of Minamoto no Yoritomo, nicknamed Otohime (乙姫).